Nikolay Ivanovich Zhukovsky (( in Ufa – ) was a Russian revolutionary and narodnik, a follower of Mikhail Bakunin; he was born in Ufa and died in Geneva.

References

1833 births
1895 deaths
Politicians from Ufa
Russian revolutionaries
Imperial Moscow University alumni